Arden Anglican School is an independent Anglican co-educational early learning, primary and secondary day school located in Beecroft and Epping, neighbouring suburbs on the North Shore of Sydney, New South Wales, Australia. Established in 1922 as a preparatory feeder school for the Presbyterian Ladies' College, Sydney, the school now caters for approximately 700 students from Pre-school to Year 12. Arden's first Year 12 class commenced in 2008. It used to be an only girls' school in 1923 but 10 years later added the first ever boy and now it is a boys' and girls' school. Arden Anglican College is a member of the Association of Heads of Independent Schools of Australia (AHISA), the Independent Primary School Heads of Australia (IPSHAA) and Junior School Heads Association of Australia, the Association of Independent Co-Educational Schools, and the Association of Independent Schools of New South Wales.

History
Began as a preparatory school of the Presbyterian Ladies' College, Sydney (PLC Sydney). The idea of a PLC Sydney preparatory school on the northern railway line, had first been suggested , however, nothing came of these ideas then. On 23 February 1922, the PLC Council received a request from the Beecroft Presbyterian Congregation, that a primary school be established at Cheltenham. Subsequently, a sub-committee of the Council was formed to investigate its viability and inspect a number of sites in Beecroft and Pennant Hills. Arden has been recently recognized as a leading sports school in the Hillzone sports for 2012.

Council gave the committee power to open a preparatory school in the Beecroft Church Hall, to appoint a teacher-in-charge and to make any other arrangements necessary. By the April 1922 Council meeting, it was reported that the school had been opened at Beecroft with 13 female pupils, and with Eleanor Linck in charge. This school was named the Presbyterian Ladies' College, Beecroft and was to serve as an all-girls, primary feeder school for the Presbyterian Ladies' College, Croydon.

Over the next few years, enrolments grew and an assistant teacher was appointed. However, PLC Beecroft was not a financial success and Council enthusiasm began to wane. Linck tried her best to expand the school, suggesting that "Romana House" on Beecroft Road be purchased to allow for further enrolments, and that the house next door to the Church Hall be purchased so that boarders could be accommodated. Despite the school's strong number of enrolment applications, these requests were all declined.

In 1925, an additional teacher was appointed to teach kindergarten and sports. It was reported that the local community was taking an interest in the new PLC, as that year two prizes had been presented to the school by the Beecroft School of Arts for library proficiency, and the Beecroft Presbyterian Women's Guild presented a prize for Scripture. In 1926, Mrs Linck resigned to take up a position at the Presbyterian Ladies' College, Melbourne, and Mrs. Lucy I. Ritter was appointed head. Later that year, two council members suggested that a house be purchased to expand the school and widen its tuition scope, however again nothing came of this. Council now appeared to be uninterested in the Beecroft school.

Ritter, in the Assembly report for 1927, complained that "Beecroft deserves more support from Presbyterians on the Hornsby line." The school continued to make losses and so on 19 June 1929, Council decided that it was to be closed. Ritter, and the assistant teacher Ms. Gurney, resigned in December of that year. In 1930, Gurney reopened the school in the Church Hall, which she named "Arden" after the Shakespearean Forest of Peace in As You Like It. The school flourished under her leadership.

Arden came under the control of the Anglican Diocesan Schools in 1946, and subsequently moved to St John's Beecroft Church Hall where it was named Arden Anglican College. The college moved again in 1952 to a house in Wongala Crescent, and in 1962, property was purchased on Beecroft Road.

In 2000, due to demand from the local community, preliminary plans for a secondary school at Arden began. The school purchased the former site of the Australian American International School at Oxford Street, Epping in 2001, and in 2003, the first year 7 class commenced at the new senior campus. Yearly expansion has continued since then and concluded with the first Year 12 class graduating in 2008. 2008 also saw the opening of the Senior Studies Centre. Located directly opposite the secondary campus, it facilitates learning for year 11 and 12 (Preliminary and HSC) students in a "corporate-style" environment. In 2017, Arden announced a planned $21 million redevelopment of its Epping campus. In 2018, the Principal Graham Anderson signed a petition with the Anglican Diocese of Sydney to retain s 38(3) in the Sex Discrimination Act 1984(Cth) which allows private religious schools to discriminate against staff and students based on sexual orientation. In the petition it was argued that 'a more general right' to religious freedom should exist, and the existing statutory 'exemptions should remain'.

In 2017, Arden announced a $21 million redevelopment of its Secondary Campus in Epping, to be finished in early 2020, in what would become known as 'Essex'. The new building accommodates:
 New Administration
 Student Services
 New Science Laboratories
 New Food Technology Kitchen
 Hammond Resource Centre (Library)
 Multiple TAS Workshops
 Multiple General Classrooms
 The Arden Creative Arts Centre (TACAC)
 Rooftop Terrace
 Underground car/motorcycle/bicycle parking space
 Twin outdoor multi-sport courts
 Two levels connect with the existing building, refurbished

Motto 
The motto of Arden is 'In God My Joy'. The motto intends to stress that students show others the joy to be found by learning to put Jesus first in your life, to then consider the needs of others, as well as reflecting on developing yourself with God's guidance. It intends to make students insist upon putting Jesus first, others second, yourself third; and to wrestle at all times with Jesus' fabulous parable of the Good Samaritan: to love your neighbour as yourself; to care for "The Other" and to be inclusive of the broken.

Governance
Arden Anglican School is governed by the council. The Synod of the Anglican Diocese of Sydney elects 10 persons for the council, along with the other persons appointed by the archbishop.

The role of the council is to serve the Arden community by ensuring long term planning is undertaken, appropriate policies are implemented and that finances are managed in a prudent manner. The council also appoints the principal. The day-to-day operations of the school are managed by the principal in which they also report to the council. The council meets on the first Wednesday of each month during term time and there are three committees of the council:
 Finance
 Governance
 Property Development and Planning

Campus
Arden Anglican College is located on two campuses in the north-western suburbs of Sydney.

Curriculum
The primary school follows a curriculum mandated by the NSW Board of Studies, and where required is tailored to meet the needs of individual students. Specialist teachers are used for subjects such as Physical Education (PE), Music, Art, French language, Science, Library, Computer and Problem Solving.

The secondary school also follows the Board of Studies curriculum. In 2008, the first year 12 class completed the NSW Higher School Certificate.

Co-curriculum

Sport
Arden offers sport to all year levels, and students may partake in house and inter school competitions.

Through Arden's membership of the Junior School Heads Association of Australia, Primary students may represent the school in sports such as athletics, swimming, cross-country, gymnastics, T-ball, softball, minkey (mini hockey), hockey, netball, basketball, rugby, and women's soccer.

Secondary students may represent Arden in cricket, basketball, soccer (indoor/outdoor), rugby, netball, athletics, cross-country, softball, hockey, in the HZSA (Hills Zone Sports Association).

Every year there are various sporting events where the three houses (Birnam, Sherwood and Jenolan) compete. These events include the swimming carnival, cross-country and athletics carnival.

Arts

Arden offers a wide range of performing arts opportunities, including but not limited to band, wind ensemble, orchestra, secondary vocal ensemble, and chamber choir. There are a multitude of clubs ranging from robotics to philosophy. The Arden Creative Arts Centre (TACAC) has a purpose-built theatre that regularly hosts Theatresports and Drama class performances.

See also 

 List of non-government schools in New South Wales

References

External links
 Arden Anglican School website

Educational institutions established in 1922
Anglican secondary schools in Sydney
Junior School Heads Association of Australia Member Schools
Anglican primary schools in Sydney
1922 establishments in Australia
Epping, New South Wales